Henry Summerson is an English historian. He is the author of a number of books.

Summerson worked for the Carlisle Archaeological Unit and wrote a history of medieval Carlisle (1993). He was then employed by English Heritage writing a number of guidebooks on English castles. He is an editor of the Oxford Dictionary of National Biography, for which he has written 165 articles. He was Research Edition for the Dictionary'''s medieval and Tudor articles, and is now an associate research editor. He has taken part in the Oxford Holinshed Project.

A participant in the Magna Carta Project, Summerson has written commentaries chapter by chapter of the original Magna Carta of 1215, and its sequel of 1225.

Summerson is a Fellow of the Royal Historical Society.

WorksThe maintenance of law and order in England, 1227-63. Ph.D. dissertation 1975, University of Cambridge, supervisor D. J. V. FisherCrown Pleas of the Devon Eyre of 1238 (1985), court records, editorMedieval Carlisle: The City and the Borders from the Late Eleventh to the Mid-Sixteenth Century (1993, 2 vols.)Crown Pleas of the Wiltshire Eyre, 1268 (2012), court records, editor with Brenda Farr and Christopher Robin ElringtonCarlisle Castle'' (2013), with M. R. McCarthy, and R. G. Annis

References

External links
Henry Summerson at GoodReads

Year of birth unknown
Living people
British male writers
Fellows of the Royal Historical Society
Year of birth missing (living people)